Soul Session Live is a 1989 live album by James Brown. Credited on the album cover to "James Brown & Friends", it features guest performances from Joe Cocker, Wilson Pickett, Billy Vera, and Robert Palmer. It also includes one studio track, "Gimme Your Love", a duet between Brown and Aretha Franklin which was their first and only recording together. It was released in connection with an HBO/Cinemax concert film, Soul Session.

Two of the album's tracks were nominated for Grammy Awards at the 1990 ceremony: "Gimme Your Love", for Best R&B Performance by a Duo or Group with Vocal, and Cocker's solo rendition of "When a Man Loves a Woman", for Best R&B Song.

Track listing

References

James Brown live albums
1989 live albums
Albums produced by Narada Michael Walden

Scotti Brothers Records albums